Charles Dreyfus (b. Alsace, 1848 - d. Menton, France, 11 December 1935) was President of the Manchester Zionist Society, a member of Manchester City Council and a leading figure in the East Manchester Conservative Association during the time that Arthur Balfour was Member of Parliament for the constituency and Prime Minister. At Dreyfus' suggestion Balfour and the Zionist leader Chaim Weizmann (later first President of the State of Israel) first met at a constituency meeting on 27 January 1905. Dreyfus had been introduced to Weizmann by the Zionist activist and writer Joseph Massel. Dreyfus was Weizmann's employer in Manchester and remained a friend until his death.

Dreyfus was born in Alsace, France and studied chemistry in Strasbourg. He emigrated to Manchester in 1869, where he established the Clayton Aniline Company in 1876. As a councillor he led the campaign for a Jewish hospital.

Charles Dreyfus was a distant relative of Alfred Dreyfus, the young Jewish artillery officer at the centre of the notorious French political scandal, the Dreyfus affair.

References

Bibliography
Charles Dreyfus, Yellow Dyes and the Balfour Declaration, by Bob Weintraub. Chemistry in Israel.  Bulletin of the Israel Chemical Society. issue 25, October 2010.

1848 births
1935 deaths
Zionist activists
19th-century British chemists
19th-century British businesspeople
French emigrants to England
19th-century French Jews
People from Alsace
Councillors in Manchester